Mohana Bhogaraju is an Indian playback singer who has recorded songs in Telugu-language films. She gained recognition with the song "Manohari" from the film Baahubali: The Beginning for which she won the Radio Mirchi–Mirchi Music upcoming female vocalist 2015 award in Telugu Cinema.

Early life
Bhogaraju was born in Eluru, Andhra Pradesh but her family is settled in Hyderabad. She completed her bachelor's degree from Bhojreddy Engineering College and MBA from Osmania University. Since childhood, Bhogaraju has always had a fascination towards music and participated in many competitions held at schools and at various ethnic auditoriums such as Ravindra Bharati, Thyagaraja Ghana Sabha. She began singing at the age of 6. She received her first award from the former Assembly Speaker D. Sripada Rao at the age of 8.

Musical career
Bhogaraju started her career in 2013. She has sung her first song "Sayyama Masam" in the 2013 Telugu film Jai Sriram. She gained recognition by singing "Manohari" from. Baahubali: The Beginning. Her song "Bhale Bhale Magadivoy" from the film Bhale Bhale Magadivoy was charted in Radio Mirchi. She has given her voice in more than 100 Telugu films.

Awards and nominations
 Radio Mirchi Music - Upcoming Female Vocalist award for the song "Manohari" from the film Baahubali: The Beginning (2015).
 Nominated for Filmfare Award for Best Female Playback Singer – Telugu for the song "Size Sexy" from the film Size Zero (2015)
 TSR - TV9 Special Jury Award for the Song "Reddammathalli" from the film Aravinda Sametha Veera Raghava (2018).
 Nominated for Filmfare Award for Best Female Playback Singer – Telugu for the song "Redamma Thalli" from the film Aravinda Sametha Veera Raghava (2019)
 Nominated for SIIMA Award for Best Female Playback Singer – Telugu for the song "Oo Bava" from the film Prati Roju Pandage (2021)

Discography

As a playback singer

Singles

References

External links
 

Living people
Indian women singers
People from Eluru
Year of birth missing (living people)
21st-century Indian women singers
Telugu playback singers
Tamil playback singers
Kannada playback singers
Indian pop singers
21st-century Indian singers
Singers from Andhra Pradesh
Film musicians from Andhra Pradesh
Punjabi singers
Indian women pop singers
Indian folk-pop singers
Indian women playback singers
Indian women folk singers
Indian women classical singers
21st-century Indian classical singers